Svinica is a village and municipality in Košice-okolie District in the Kosice Region of eastern Slovakia.

Etymology
Svinia or Svinná, later Svinica, derived from sviňa (Proto-Slavic svinьja) - a pig. 1276 Zyna, 1369 Scwynycza, 1427 Szyna, 1430 Zwynne.

History
In historical records the village was first mentioned in 1276 as belonging to paladin Omodey, lords of Füzér Castle. In the 13th century it belonged to Perényi family and it began an important market place. In 1772 it passed to Szerencsy falily.

Geography
The village lies at an altitude of 250 metres and covers an area of 27.106 km2. The municipality has a population of about 815 people.

References

External links

http://www.cassovia.sk/obce/svinica/

Villages and municipalities in Košice-okolie District